Russian National Commercial Bank is a bank operating mostly in Crimea. It has over 200 branches as of 2015, making it the most widespread bank in Crimea.

RNKB is based in Simferopol and owned by the Federal Agency for State Property Management. The bank was assigned an A rating by the Russian ACRA rating agency.

Originally a subsidiary of VTB, it was acquired by the Crimean government weeks after the peninsula was annexed by Russia. While the bank has no formal ties to the VTB Group, its establishment as a separate entity was seen as a way to avoid the effect of sanctions.

The Russian National Commercial Bank took over numerous branches of banks that retreated from Crimea following Russia's Annexation thus making it the largest banking network in Crimea.

The bank has issued over a million Mir payment cards as of April 2017. Major companies such as Visa and MasterCard are barred from issuing cards to banks with a presence in Crimea.

According to Vedomosti, in August 2017 the software company Finastra refused to sell its SWIFT interface to the bank, effectively cutting it off from SWIFT.

Sanctions
Because of Russian interference in Ukraine and its annexation of Crimea, the Russian National Commercial Bank is under sanctions by the European Union since July 30, 2014, Liechtenstein since July 31, 2014, Canada since August 6, 2014, Switzerland since August 27, 2014, Australia since September 2, 2014, and the United States since March 11, 2015.

Sanctioned by New Zealand.

References

External links
 Official website

Banks of Russia
Government-owned companies of Russia
Companies based in Crimea
Russian entities subject to the U.S. Department of the Treasury sanctions